Shigeki Nishiguchi (born 2 July 1965) is a Japanese wrestler. He competed at the 1988 Summer Olympics and the 1992 Summer Olympics.

References

1965 births
Living people
Japanese male sport wrestlers
Olympic wrestlers of Japan
Wrestlers at the 1988 Summer Olympics
Wrestlers at the 1992 Summer Olympics
Sportspeople from Wakayama Prefecture
Asian Games medalists in wrestling
Wrestlers at the 1990 Asian Games
Wrestlers at the 1994 Asian Games
Asian Games gold medalists for Japan
Medalists at the 1990 Asian Games
20th-century Japanese people
21st-century Japanese people
World Wrestling Championships medalists